Constituency MR-3 is a reserved constituency for minorities in the Khyber Pakhtunkhwa Assembly.

See also
 Constituency WR-01
 Constituency WR-02
 Constituency WR-03
 Constituency WR-04
 Constituency WR-11
 Constituency WR-22
 Constituency MR-2

References

Khyber Pakhtunkhwa Assembly constituencies